Palumbina nesoclera is a moth of the family Gelechiidae. It was described by Edward Meyrick in 1929. It is found in India's  Andaman Islands.

The wingspan is about 12 mm. The forewings are rather dark grey with the costal edge white from the base to four-fifths, beneath this a small basal patch of irregular whitish markings. There is a cloudy whitish spot from the costa at one-third reaching halfway across the wing, and two triangular whitish dots transversely placed at two-thirds, the lower rather anterior. The hindwings are grey, thinly scaled in the disc.

References

Moths described in 1929
Palumbina
Taxa named by Edward Meyrick